Abidjan Azur Basketball, also known simply as Azur, is an Ivorian basketball club based in Abidjan. The team competes in the Ivorian Basketball Championship.

Honours
Ivorian Championship
Runners-up (1): 2019
Ivorian Cup
Winners (1): 2018
Ivorian Supercup
Runners-up (1): 2019

References

Basketball teams in Ivory Coast